Hussein Dey (real name Hüseyin bin Hüseyin; 1765 – 1838) was the last Dey of the Deylik of Algiers.

Early life 
He was born either in İzmir or Urla in the Ottoman Empire. He went to Istanbul and joined the Canoneers (Topçular in Turkish), and quickly rose to the rank of Oda-Bachy, but thanks to his character and rivalries, he was forced to flee the Ottoman Empire. He fled to the Deylik of Algiers, a country which was De facto independent from the Ottoman Empire, similar to the other countries of the Barbary Coast. Algiers was well known for accepting fugitives of different countries. In Algiers, he joined the Odjak of Algiers and became a Janissary. In 1815 he was appointed Khodjet al-khil, a minister tasked with raising and commanding the cavalry of the Dey and raising taxes. He commanded the cavalry as a quick relief force during the bombardment of Algiers in 1816. 

In 1818 following the death of the previous Dey, the Divan of Algiers elected Hussein as the next ruler.

Rule 
Husseyn Dey succeeded Ali V ben Ahmed as dey of Algiers in March 1818. He enacted some measures such as freeing hostages and ensuring freedom of religion for the Jews.

The French conquest of Algeria

In an attempt by Charles X of France to increase his popularity amongst the French people, he sought to bolster patriotic sentiment, and turn eyes away from his domestic policies, by "skirmishing against the dey". This eventually lead to the French conquest of Algeria.

The Fly Whisk Incident

In the 1790s, France had contracted to purchase wheat for the French army from two Jewish merchants in Algiers, Messrs. Bakri-Busnach, and was in arrears paying them.  These merchants had themselves debts to the dey and claimed inability to pay those debts until France paid its debts to them.  The dey had unsuccessfully negotiated with Pierre Deval, the French consul, to rectify this situation, and he suspected Deval of collaborating with the merchants against him, especially when the French government made no provisions for repaying the merchants in 1820.  Deval's nephew Alexandre, the consul in Annaba, further angered the dey by fortifying French storehouses in Annaba and El Kala against the terms of prior agreements.

After a contentious meeting in which Deval refused to provide satisfactory answers on 29 April 1827, the dey struck Deval with his fly whisk.  Charles X used this slight against his diplomatic representative to first demand an apology from the dey, and then to initiate a blockade against the port of Algiers.  When the dey responded to a demand to send an ambassador to France to resolve the incident by firing cannons toward one of the blockading ships, the French determined that more forceful action was required.

Invasion of Algiers (June 1830)

Hussein Dey agreed to surrender in exchange for his freedom and the offer to retain possession of his personal wealth. This marked the end of the Deylik and the start of French rule in Algeria.

Exile
On July 15, 1830, five days after his surrender to the French, Husseyn Dey left Algiers with his family, his harem and his personal fortune on the French ship Jeanne d'Arc. His request for permission to live in France having been refused by Charles X, he settled in Naples. He stayed in Italy for three years and died in Alexandria in 1838.

Legacy
A suburb of the city of Algiers has been named after Hussein Dey and the district that surrounds it bears the same name. The top tier football team NA Hussein Dey is based here.

References

1765 births
1838 deaths
People from İzmir
Deys of Algiers